Herrens Veje, entitled Ride Upon the Storm in the English-language subtitled version, is a 2017 Danish drama television series created by Adam Price, produced by Camilla Hammerich and starring Lars Mikkelsen.

Synopsis 
The story centres on a family of priests that traces its roots in the Church of Denmark (the Danish national church) back more than 250 years.

Johannes (Lars Mikkelsen) is a senior priest and Area Dean, married to Elisabeth (Ann Eleonora Jørgensen). The first episode follows Johannes (with the support of his staff and family) through the election process for the new Bishop of Copenhagen. Johannes, a traditionalist candidate, is narrowly beaten by the progressive female candidate in the final round of the election. Many subsequent themes are predicated upon Johannes's disappointment and frustration at his failure to become the first bishop in the clerical family.

The couple have two sons, August (Morten Hee Andersen), and Kristian (Simon Sears). August is also a priest, serving in a Copenhagen suburban parish church, and as a military chaplain in the Royal Danish Army. Kristian also trained for ordination as a priest, but dropped out of his seminary in his final year. Kristian, whose behaviour can be reckless, and often a disappointment to his father, is found in the first episode completing an academic dissertation, at which he is discovered to have cheated.

Johannes is God-like to his sons – he gives, loves, and punishes. His favouritism for August and his disappointment with Kristian forces both into making desperate choices in order either to gain his love or to break free from him.  Their path will lead us into war and encounters between different religions, seen through the intimate lens of a family drama.

Cast

Main
 Lars Mikkelsen as Johannes Krogh
 Ann Eleonora Jørgensen as Elisabeth Krogh
 Simon Sears as Kristian Krogh
 Morten Hee Andersen as August Krogh

Recurring
 Fanny Louise Bernth as Emilie
 Yngvild Støen Grotmol as Liv
 Camilla Lau as Amira
 Joen Højerslev as Svend
 Laura Bro as Monica Ravn
 Patricia Schumann as Ursula
 Mathias Flint as Simon Andreasen
 Maj-Britt Mathiesen as Lotte
 Johanne Dal-Lewkovitch as Naja
 Solbjørg Højfeldt as Nete
 Joachim Fjesltrup as Mark
 Lars Ranthe as Daniel
 Hadi Ka-koush as Walid

Accolades

See also
List of Danish television series

References

External links

Danish drama television series
DR television dramas
2010s Danish television series
2017 Danish television series debuts
Danish-language television shows
Television series by StudioCanal